Francis Patrick Hoy (19 October 1934 – 21 April 2005) was a Scottish professional wrestler, better known by the ring names Black Angus Campbell, Wild Angus, and Rasputin (whilst wearing a wrestling mask).

Early life 
Hoy was born in Enniskillen in Northern Ireland.

Professional wrestling career 
Wearing a long black beard and a kilt, Hoy wrestled as a heel, mostly in Europe (where he featured regularly on World of Sport in the United Kingdom during the 1970s and 1980s), and managed one of his greatest achievements in 1978 when he captured the European Heavyweight Championship.

Hoy also wrestled in North America, initially with Stampede Wrestling and later in Central States Wrestling, where from around 1970 to 1973 he was a regular performer under the management of Percival A. Friend. Here his most notable feuds were against Buck Robley and Ox Baker. He also wrestled in Japan, including a notable 45-minute draw in 1978 at the Hakodate City Gym, Hokkaidō featuring Billy Robinson and himself against Dory Funk, Jr. and Terry Funk.

In later life Hoy ended his involvement with wrestling and, according to Harley Race, worked as a park ranger in Scotland. He died in his home town of Stranraer in 2005. His son, Steve McHoy aka Steve Casey, was also a professional wrestler.

Championships and accomplishments
All Japan Pro Wrestling
World's Strongest Tag Determination League Technique Award (1978) – with Billy Robinson
Central States Wrestling
NWA Central States Heavyweight Championship (1 time)
NWA Central States Television Championship (1 time)
NWA North American Tag Team Championship (Central States version) (1 time) – with Roger Kirby
Joint Promotions/All Star Wrestling	
European Heavyweight Championship (1 time)
Pacific Northwest Wrestling
NWA Pacific Northwest Heavyweight Championship (1 time)
Stampede Wrestling
Stampede North American Heavyweight Championship (2 times)

References

External links 
 
 by Percival A. Friend
A pull-around with "Mad" Jock Cameron (long-time tag partner of Frank Hoy) by Brian Elliott

1934 births
2005 deaths
20th-century professional wrestlers
Expatriate sportspeople from Northern Ireland in the United States
Male professional wrestlers from Northern Ireland
People from Enniskillen
Scottish male professional wrestlers
Stampede Wrestling alumni
Stampede Wrestling North American Heavyweight Champions